Kaunas Fluxus Airport,  is the second-busiest civil airport in Lithuania after Vilnius Airport and the fourth-busiest in the Baltic states.

History
Kaunas Airport started operations in 1988 when airport activities were moved from the historic S. Darius and S. Girėnas Airport, located in the central part of Kaunas city. In 1991, after Lithuania's independence, it gained the status of an international airport and in 1996 it became a member of Airports Council International and began to take part in the activities of the "Lithuanian Airports" association.

Kaunas Airport was used by YAK-40, and YAK-42 of the local Aeroflot branch since 1988. The flight range was moderate and there were some scheduled flights from Kaunas to Kyiv, Kharkiv, Moscow, Odessa, Simferopol, and Šiauliai. Regional airline Air Lithuania based in Kaunas operated scheduled and charter flights from Kaunas to Budapest, Billund, Hamburg, Malmö, and Oslo from 1993 till 2004.

Ryanair started operating flights to Kaunas in 2004. In 2006 it announced establishment of its base in Kaunas. At the beginning of 2013, Ryanair invested more than 3 million euros in a new aircraft maintenance and repair hangar in Kaunas, which currently employs 220 people (2018 data). The airline is further expanding its aircraft maintenance activity at Kaunas Airport, with a planned further investment of 1.6 million euros, which will allow the servicing of twice as many aircraft. The company intends to employ 40 additional aviation mechanics, and the employment strategy is based on the company's collaboration with the Kaunas School of Mechanics at Kaunas University of Technology in order to prepare necessary specialists and invite students for traineeships.

Air Baltic operated Riga - Kaunas daily flights in 2006-2008 and 2009–2014, sometimes reaching up to 2 daily flights.

Wizzair operated Kaunas-Warsaw-London Luton route for a short period of time in 2005. The airline returned to Kaunas in 2012.

Two temporary terminals were in operation in 2017, when Vilnius Airport was closed for reconstruction and flights transferred to Kaunas.

LOT Polish Airlines started operating six weekly flights to Kaunas International from Warsaw on 21 May 2018.

Overview

Ownership
The airport is owned and operated by the State-owned enterprise Kauno Aerouostas, and is fully governable to the Ministry of Transport and Communications. In May 2013, the Government announced about the plans to merge Vilnius, Kaunas and Palanga airports into one company and the plans were approved by the Lithuanian parliament in November 2013. The merger took place in 2014.

Operations

Ryanair is the main passenger carrier at the airport, and has gradually expanded its network there since 2005 when the airline first landed at the airport. In 2010, Kaunas Airport became the first airline's base in Eastern Europe and this resulted a more-than-doubled-route network expansion at the airport. The airport reported 77% growth in passenger traffic that year and also won the EURO ANNIES 2011 prize awarded by a weekly aviation e-journal anna.aero as being the fastest-growing airport in Europe in the category of under one million passengers.

Catchment area
Almost a quarter of all passenger flow at the airport are travellers from the neighbouring countries Latvia, Belarus and Poland.

Infrastructure

Terminal building 

In 2008 the new three-storey terminal building was opened for passenger operations. The  building can handle 800,000 passengers per year and the maximum capacity has been already reached in 2010, three years after the opening. The simple linear terminal design allows further expansions both ways.

The ground level is designated arrival area and fully complies with Schengen regulations. There are all essential facilities for arriving passengers, including bureau de change and car rental offices. The upper two levels are for departing passengers only. All 12 check-in desks are located on the first floor, where the passengers flow is separated to Schengen and non-Schengen departure zones through the security areas located on the first and second floors. The airport is not equipped with air bridges which suits the preference of airport's biggest client Ryanair of boarding and disembarking with steps.

The terminal facilities also include airline ticket offices, tourism agents, several shops, bars and cafes throughout the airport.

Runway and apron
The runway of Kaunas Airport is 3,250m long and 45m wide, and is categorized with a 4E ICAO reference code. This enables to handle aircraft with up to 45m wing span  and 14m main gear wheel span, which includes planes the size of a Boeing 747 or Antonov An-124. The runway is oriented along the dominant direction of western winds; it is also equipped with CAT II ILS equipment which allows Kaunas Airport to receive aircraft with minimum visibility meteorological conditions.

Theoretical runway average capacity, when aircraft are landing or taking off, is 12 operations per hour. A new taxiway to improve the runway system was built in 2009. Further taxiway improvement works started in June 2013, expanding the southern part of the airport to construct a new 190m-long and 23.2m-broad runway by the end of 2014.

Maintenance facilities
Ryanair operates its own maintenance hangar at Kaunas Airport, which launched operations in January 2013. It can accommodate one aircraft at a time and performs C-type maintenance checks. The same year Ryanair has set to double its MRO capabilities at the airport and began construction of the second hangar in Kaunas.

FL Technics has announced its plans to invest almost 4 million US dollars into high-tech aircraft maintenance equipment at its newly launched MRO hangar in Kaunas. The latest equipment will support FL Technics MRO centre in servicing both narrow and wide body modern aircraft, including Boeing 747 and Boeing 787 Dreamliner. Following the full implementation, of the investment strategy, the new FL Technics base in Kaunas will create almost 300 new jobs, including over 200 places for aircraft mechanics, engineers and other aviation technical personnel.

Airlines and destinations

The following airlines operate regular scheduled and charter flights at Kaunas Airport:

Statistics 

The passenger traffic changes in late 2011 and early 2012 at Kaunas Airport are associated with the rivalry between Ryanair and Wizzair. As a response to the Wizzair's new base established at Vilnius Airport in Spring 2011, the Irish low-cost carrier moved Girona and Milan Bergamo routes from Kaunas to Vilnius in late 2011. In November 2012, Ryanair further cut route geography from Kaunas, by transferring Brussels Charleroi, Leeds, Liverpool, London Luton and Oslo Rygge to Vilnius, leaving only four routes available from Kaunas for the entire winter 2012/13 season. Some of the routes were restored in Summer 2013, including seasonal destinations.

List of the busiest airports in the Baltic states

Most frequent routes

Ground transportation

Motorway
Due to its central location in Lithuania, Kaunas Airport is easily accessible via nearby A6 highway/E262, which connects to the other main motorways in Lithuania A1 motorway (Lithuania) and Via Baltica (E67). Taxis take around 25 minutes to get to the city centre.

Bus
Kaunas city centre is reachable by direct bus route no 29, operated daily by Kauno Autobusai. The express service 29E operates on the same route, but offers limited bus stops on the line. The direct intercity services to capital Vilnius and Lithuanian coastal city Klaipeda are also available from and to Kaunas Airport as well as regional low frequency bus links to and from Anykščiai, Biržai, Ignalina, Kupiškis, Marijampolė, Molėtai, Obeliai, Rokiškis, Širvintos, Utena, Visaginas and Zarasai.

The only international link to the airport is provided by Latvian operator Flybus, which runs the schedule to both Riga city centre and Riga International Airport. The services are based on the timetable of departing and arriving flights at Kaunas Airport.

Other facilities

The Airpark is a territory of Kaunas Free Economic Zone adjacent to Kaunas Airport (3 km border).

See also 
List of the busiest airports in the Baltic states
List of the busiest airports in Europe
Transport in Lithuania

References

External links

 Official website
 

Airports in Lithuania
Airports built in the Soviet Union
1988 establishments in the Soviet Union
Airport
Buildings and structures in Kaunas County
International airports in Lithuania